The Classical Association of Scotland is a learned society founded in 1902. It brings together researchers in classical studies throughout Scotland and holds regular meetings.

Professor Douglas Cairns of the University of Edinburgh is its chairman of council. Some older records of the association are held by Glasgow University Archive Services.

References

External links
 Official website.

Learned societies of Scotland
Clubs and societies of the University of Edinburgh
1902 establishments in Scotland
Classical associations and societies
Organizations established in 1902